William Lee Brown (December 25, 1840 Vermont – December 13, 1906 Great Barrington, Berkshire County, Massachusetts) was an American newspaper publisher and politician from Ohio and New York.

Life
The family removed to Mahoning County, Ohio, soon after William was born. He taught school in Ohio, and then in Copiah County, Mississippi, until 1861. During the American Civil War he fought with the 88th and the 125th Ohio Volunteers.

After the war, he removed to Virginia City, then the capital of the Montana Territory. He was Chief Clerk of the Territorial Legislature, and also engaged in gold mining.

A few years later, he returned to Youngstown, Ohio. He was a delegate from Ohio to the 1872 and 1876 Democratic National Conventions. In 1874, he was aide-de-camp to Gov. William Allen, with the rank of colonel. In 1875, he was elected to the Ohio State Senate. From 1875 to 1880, he published The Vindicator in Youngstown.

In 1880, he removed to New York City and became a partner of Benjamin Wood, co-publishing the New York Daily News.

Brown was a delegate from New York to the 1884 and 1888 Democratic National Conventions; and a member of the New York State Senate (5th D.) from 1890 to 1893, sitting in the 113th, 114th, 115th and 116th New York State Legislatures.

After the death of Benjamin Wood in 1900, his widow Ida Wood ousted Brown from the management of the paper, and Brown retired to an estate in Great Barrington, Massachusetts, where he engaged in horse and cattle breeding. He died there on December 13, 1906.

Sources
 The New York Red Book compiled by Edgar L. Murlin (published by James B. Lyon, Albany NY, 1897; pg. 403f)
 New York State Legislative Souvenir for 1893 with Portraits of the Members of Both Houses by Henry P. Phelps (pg. 8f)
 Biographical sketches of the members of the Legislature in The Evening Journal Almanac (1892)
 COL. BROWN AND HIS PAPER PASS AWAY TOGETHER in NYT on December 14, 1906
 History of Youngstown and the Mahoning Valley, Ohio by Joseph Green Butler, Jr. (1921; Vol. I, pg. 348)

1840 births
1906 deaths
Democratic Party New York (state) state senators
19th-century American newspaper editors
Politicians from Youngstown, Ohio
People from Great Barrington, Massachusetts
Ohio state senators
Journalists from New York City
Journalists from Ohio
People from Mahoning County, Ohio
People from Copiah County, Mississippi
People from Virginia City, Montana
19th-century American politicians